Helpmekaar Kollege is a private Afrikaans medium co-educational high school situated in Braamfontein, in the city of Johannesburg in the Gauteng province of South Africa.

History 
Helpmekaar was the first Afrikaans high school in Johannesburg. The school was started by a group of Afrikaners who wanted their children to have an alternative to English high schools. The school was officially started in 1921 in the Irene Church opposite the Union Ground. Construction of the school started on 19 September 1925 with the foundation stone being laid by General Barry Hertzog. The land was donated by the Johannesburg City Council at Milner Park, Braamfontein. The school badge was designed by a matric pupil of 1925, A.J. Lessing.

The slogan of the school "KOMAAN" was derived from a poem by Jan F. E. Celliers by the same title. Literally translated, Komaan Helpmekaar means “come on, help each other”.

Campus 
The Helpmekaar Campus is situated on the corner of Empire and Melle Street, Braamfontein, Johannesburg.

The school building consists of five parts: 
The Old Building (with the clock tower on top) 
The Newer Buildings 
The Terraces 
The Far East
The DI Hub

The school also has a rugby field, uniform shop, three tennis courts, two netball practice courts, two halls, a swimming pool and a boarding house.

Curriculum 
Helpmekaar follows the IEB curriculum. 

Pupils are also given the opportunity to write the SAT, a standardized college admission test used in the United States, in Grade 11.

Extracurricular activities 
The school offers a wide variety of extracurricular activities including:

Sports
 Rugby
 Netball
 Tennis
 Hockey
 Swimming
 Cricket
 Adventure Racing
 Athletics
 Cross country
 Chess
 Golf
 Orientation
 Squash
 Equestrian
 E-Sports
 Mountain biking

Cultural
 Choir
 Eisteddfod
 School paper
 Speech guild
 Debating
 Public speaking
 Dancing
 Orchestra
 ATKV (Afrikaans Cultural Organisation)
 School production

Academic
 Hip2B2
 Robotix
 Afrikaans Olympiad
 English Olympiad
 Mathematics Olympiad
 General Knowledge Olympiad

Traditions

School uniform 
Helpmekaar's school uniform has a style that forms part of the school's traditions and past. The basic uniform mainly consists of a brown blazer with a khaki jersey and white shirt, brown tie and khaki trousers or shorts for boys and a khaki dress for girls. Boys always wear caps, while girls always wear bashers. Girls do not have to wear ties during summer (except matrics; see below) and in winter they are allowed to wear long khaki pants or dark tights.

The school has special, striped blazers for learners who perform exceptionally well in academic, sports and cultural activities. Traditionally these blazers may only be worn by seniors (i.e. grade 10 to matric).

A white blazer is the highest, most honourable blazer in the school and is given to prefects, cheerleaders and the head boy and head girl to be worn on special occasions. Matrics also have special ties that are lighter than the traditional brown school tie.

Klets, Knibbel en Kykfees 
The Klets, Knibbel en Kykfees (Chat, Nibble and Watch festival), commonly known as the KKK fees, gives learners the opportunity to express their creativity by participating in various cultural activities. With boat-building, debating, cupcake decorating, stand-up comedy, graffiti, poetry, rapping, idols and even paper-jet folding, it provides fun and enrichment for each Helpie involved.

Rugby spirit 
Winter is rugby season and at Helpmekaar rugby is more than just a game. The whole school attends all home games to stand behind their first team and when they reach the finals everyone goes along.

The first-team jerseys are brown and gold, whereas the other teams wear white. First-team players also have special scarves, hats and shorts that they can wear with their school uniform (mentioned above).

Golden Boys 
The Golden Boys are the official school mascots. Dressed up in brown cloaks, rugby-shorts and golden body paint, they perform at major events such as Inter-High Athletics meets, rugby games and swimming galas. Grade 10 boys are specially selected by previous Golden Boys to participate in this tradition.

Notable alumni
 Mimi Coertse
 Marius Kloppers
 Odile Harington 
 Gert Potgieter
 Louise Prinsloo
 Dan Roodt
 Magdalena K.P. Smith Meyer

See also 
 List of boarding schools

References

External links 

Afrikaner culture in Johannesburg
Boarding schools in South Africa
Schools in Johannesburg
High schools in South Africa
Private schools in Gauteng